Thomas Monteagle Bayly (March 26, 1775 – January 7, 1834) was an eighteenth and nineteenth century slave owner, politician, lawyer and planter from Virginia. He was the father of Thomas Henry Bayly.

Early life
Born on Hills Farm near Drummondtown, Virginia, Bayly attended Washington Academy in Maryland as a young man. He went on to graduate from Princeton College in New Jersey in 1794, had studied law.

Career
Bayly was admitted to the bar around 1796 commencing practice in Accomack County, Virginia. Bayly also engaged in planting.

He became a member of the Virginia House of Delegates in 1798, serving until 1801 when he left to join the Virginia State Senate, serving there until 1809. During the War of 1812, Bayly served as colonel of militia.

After the war, he was elected a Federalist to the United States House of Representatives, serving their from 1813 to 1815. Bayly was not a candidate for reelection in 1814 and instead resumed engaging in agricultural pursuits and practicing law.

He was elected a delegate to the Virginia Constitutional Convention of 1829-1830.

He returned to the House of Delegates in 1819, 1820 and from 1828 to 1831 and was a delegate to the Virginia Constitutional Convention of 1829-1830.

Death
Bayly died at his plantation called "Mount Custis" in Accomac, Virginia on January 7, 1834 and was interred in the family cemetery on the estate.

Bibliography

References

External links

1775 births
1834 deaths
Members of the Virginia House of Delegates
Virginia state senators
Virginia lawyers
Princeton University alumni
American militiamen in the War of 1812
Farmers from Virginia
People from Accomac, Virginia
American planters
Federalist Party members of the United States House of Representatives from Virginia
American militia officers
19th-century American lawyers